Si Larestan-e Jowzar (also Romanized as Sī Lārestān-e Jowzār; also known as Sī Lārestān) is a village in Kabgian Rural District, Kabgian District, Dana County, Kohgiluyeh and Boyer-Ahmad Province, Iran. At the 2006 census, its population was 71, in 13 families.

References 

Populated places in Dana County